Rod Bower may refer to:

Rod Bower (activist) (born 1962), Australian Anglican priest
Rod Bower (cricketer) (born 1959), Australian cricketer